The Austro-Hungarian wolf (Canis lupus minor), also called the reed wolf, is a proposed subspecies of the gray wolf that is thought to have once inhabited Hungary and eastern Austria. Its subspecies status is uncertain, as there are few records and no uncontroversial remains. It was once also proposed as being a golden jackal, although a status as a diminutive form of the gray wolf is more commonly accepted. It is generally assumed to have gone extinct before 1900.

According to Mammal Species of the World (3rd edition), C. l. minor is a taxonomic synonym for C.l. lupus, the Eurasian wolf, and not a separate subspecies.

References

Wolves
Subspecies of Canis lupus